is a Japanese alpine skier. She competed in three events at the 1972 Winter Olympics.

References

External links
 

1951 births
Living people
Japanese female alpine skiers
Olympic alpine skiers of Japan
Alpine skiers at the 1972 Winter Olympics
Sportspeople from Niigata Prefecture